Teda or TEDA may refer to:

Teda people, Toubou ethnic group that lives mostly in Chad
Teda language, or Tedaga language, spoken by Teda people
Tianjin Economic-Technological Development Area, abbreviated as TEDA, free market zone in Tianjin, China
 TEDA Holding,  state-owned enterprise based in Tianjin, China
 Tianjin Teda F.C., Chinese football club, a subsidiary of TEDA Holding
 TEDA Football Stadium, in Tianjin, China
 TEDA Group, a subsidiary of TEDA Holding
 Tianjin TEDA Co., a subsidiary of TEDA Group
triethylenediamine, also known as DABCO or 1,4-diazabicyclo[2.2.2]octane, a chemical compound.
Tamil Nadu Energy Development Agency also known TEDA, a state governmental agency in Indian state of Tamil Nadu.

Language and nationality disambiguation pages